Muhammad ibn Ahmad al-Wathiq (Muhammad ibn Ahmad Abu Zayyan) was Marinid Sultan of Fez from 1386 to 1387.

Life 
Musa ibn Faris al-Mutawakkil had replaced the Sultan Abul Abbas Ahmad Mustanzir in 1384.
His accession was engineered by the Nasrid dynasty of the Emirate of Granada.
In 1386 he was replaced by Muhammad ibn Ahmad al-Wathiq, who ruled until 1387.
Abul Abbas then regained the throne.

References
Citations

Sources

People from Fez, Morocco
Marinid dynasty
Sultans of Morocco
14th-century Berber people
14th-century Moroccan people
14th-century monarchs in Africa